Gyegwansan  is a mountain in South Korea. Its area extends over Gapyeong County in Gyeonggi-do and Chuncheon, the capital of Gangwon-do.

See also
 List of mountains in Korea

Notes

References
 

Mountains of South Korea
Mountains of Gangwon Province, South Korea
Mountains of Gyeonggi Province